Tropidia quadrata  (Say, 1824), the Common Thickleg Fly, is a common species of syrphid fly observed across the north-central United states and southern Canada. Hoverflies can remain nearly motionless in flight. The  adults are also  known as flower flies for they are commonly found on flowers, from which they get both energy-giving nectar and protein rich pollen. The larvae are aquatic.

Distribution
Canada, United States.

References

External links

 

Eristalinae
Diptera of North America
Hoverflies of North America
Insects described in 1824
Taxa named by Thomas Say